Warfleet can mean:
 A fleet of naval craft
 Warfleet Creek in Devon in England